The 1968–69 season was Mansfield Town's 32nd season in the Football League and 8th in the Third Division, they finished in 15th position with 43 points.

Final league table

Results

Football League Third Division

FA Cup

League Cup

Squad statistics
 Squad list sourced from

References
General
 Mansfield Town 1968–69 at soccerbase.com (use drop down list to select relevant season)

Specific

Mansfield Town F.C. seasons
Mansfield Town